Tjalke Charles Gaastra  (1879 – 1947) was an American architect who worked in the American southwest in the first half of the twentieth century. He won the International Exhibit of Architecture in Berlin for the Gildersleeve house in Santa Fe, New Mexico which he designed for New Mexico Supreme Court justice, David Chavez. Gaastra was a major player in the Spanish Pueblo Revival architectural style in Santa Fe, New Mexico.

Gaastra's best-known buildings include the 710 Gildersleeve property, the Cassell building, the Bishop's Lodge, Gormley Elementary School, and the Gustave Baumann House in Santa Fe, New Mexico; the Wool Warehouse, Monte Vista Elementary School, the Carlisle Gymnasium, the Hendren Building, and the old Bernalillo County Courthouse in Albuquerque, New Mexico; and the Theatre Building built for Jack Brandenburg in Taos, New Mexico. Several of Gaastra's buildings are listed in the National Register of Historic Places.

Early-to-mid-life
Tjalke Charles Gaastra was born in 1879, and immigrated to the mid-western United States with his family. Between the ages of 14 to 21, Gaastra worked as a hod carrier, bricklayer and logger. From 1901-1910, he was listed as an architect in Kenosha, Wisconsin. In 1911, Gaastra received his architecture license from the state of Illinois, and worked in Chicago for seven years designing schools. He married in 1917 and moved to Santa Fe, New Mexico in 1918. Gaastra was architect on the Gildersleeve home built for David Chavez in 1928, property originally owned by painter/photographer, Carlos Vierra.

Move to Albuquerque
In 1923, T. Charles Gaastra, who had come to Santa Fe in 1918 and designed buildings using the emergent Santa Fe style, had moved his practice to the larger, more promising Albuquerque which left architects John Gaw Meem and Cassius McCormick in demand.

References

1879 births
1947 deaths
Dutch emigrants to the United States
Architects from New Mexico
20th-century American architects